Giulia Terzi (born 14 August 1995) is an Italian Paralympic swimmer who competes in international level events. She was diagnosed with congenital scoliosis aged four. She competed at the 2020 Summer Paralympics, in Women's 4 × 50 mixed freestyle relay, winning a silver medal, and in Women's 50 metre butterfly S7 winning a bronze medal.

Biography
Terzi was a former gymnast at a young age but switched to Paralympic swimming after her impairment worsened causing her to have problems with her left leg and arm. She won three medals at her international debut at the 2019 World Para Swimming Championships in London.

See also
 Italy at the 2020 Summer Paralympics

References

External links
 

1995 births
Living people
Swimmers from Milan
Sportspeople from Bergamo
Paralympic swimmers of Italy
Medalists at the World Para Swimming Championships
Swimmers at the 2020 Summer Paralympics
Medalists at the 2020 Summer Paralympics
Paralympic silver medalists for Italy
Paralympic medalists in swimming
Paralympic gold medalists for Italy
Paralympic bronze medalists for Italy
Italian female freestyle swimmers
Italian female butterfly swimmers
S7-classified Paralympic swimmers